The 1986 World Aquatics Championships place in Madrid, Spain.

Medal table

Medal summary

Men

Women

1986 World Aquatics Championships
Diving at the World Aquatics Championships